The European Social Survey (ESS) is a social scientific endeavour to map the attitudes, beliefs and behaviour patterns of the various populations in Europe.
ESS is listed in the Registry of Research Data Repositories re3data.org.

Prof Rory Fitzgerald is the Director of the ESS which in 2013 became a European Research Infrastructure Consortium. The headquarters are at City, University of London.

History
The ESS was initiated by the European Science Foundation. One of the reasons to start this new time series of social scientific data was that existing cross-national attitude surveys were regarded as not of sufficient methodological rigour to draw on as reliable sources for knowledge about changes over time in Europe. Starting in 2002 the survey has been held every two years in many European countries, with round 6 (2012) covering 30 nations.

In 2013 the ESS became an independent legal entity known as an ERIC and as of 2020 has 25 Member countries and one Observer country. In 2016 the ESS became a landmark of the ESFRI roadmap in recognition of its consolidation. 

There are over 230,000 registered users of the ESS from countries across the world.

Prize
In 2005 the ESS was the winner of the Descartes Prize, an annual European science award.

Bibliography
Roger Jowell, Caroline Roberts, Rory Fitzgerald, Gillian Eva (ed.): Measuring Attitudes Cross-Nationally. Lessons from the European Social Survey, Sage Publications, 2007,

Notes

External links
http://www.europeansocialsurvey.org/

Social statistics data